Uhornyky may refer to the following places in Ukraine:

 Uhornyky, Ivano-Frankivsk, village in Ivano-Frankivsk municipality, Ivano-Frankivsk Oblast
 Uhornyky, Kolomyia Raion, village in Kolomyia Raion, Ivano-Frankivsk Oblast